C.S. Eliot Kang (born in 1962 as Choo Soon Kang) is an American diplomat and member of the Senior Executive Service. He currently serves as the Assistant Secretary for the Bureau of International Security and Nonproliferation (ISN) at the U.S. Department of State. From January to July 2021 and January 2017 to January 2018, Kang served as acting ISN Assistant Secretary and also exercised the authority of the Under Secretary of State for Arms Control and International Security Affairs.   He also served as acting ISN Assistant Secretary from January to June 2009.  Kang is one of the State Department's leading experts on nuclear affairs, including on nuclear safeguards, security, and safety matters as well as denuclearization, counterproliferation, and counter nuclear terrorism issues. On April 12, 2021, President Joe Biden announced his intention to nominate Kang as his administration's Assistant Secretary of State for International Security and Nonproliferation. He was confirmed by the United States Senate on March 29, 2022.

Early life and education 
Kang is the son of Ho Ryun Kang, a former South Korean government official and retired Air Force brigadier general residing in the United States, who was awarded the Distinguished Flying Cross, the Legion of Merit, and other medals by the U.S. Government for his actions during the Korean War. Kang's maternal great-grandfather, the late Yim Heung Soon (임흥순), was the chairman of the National Defense Committee of the Korean National Assembly during the Korean War and served as the Mayor of Seoul in 1959 and 1960.

After graduating from Lakewood High School in Lakewood Township, New Jersey, Kang earned a Bachelor of Arts from Cornell University in 1984 and then received his M.A., M.Phil., and Ph.D. from Yale University.

Career

Early career 
Before joining the State Department as a William C. Foster Fellow in 2003, Kang was a tenured professor of political science. He taught international security at the University of Pennsylvania and Northern Illinois University and has held fellowships at the Council on Foreign Relations and the Brookings Institution. He has published extensively; his writings have appeared in such publications as International Organization, World Affairs, and Comparative Strategy.

During the late 1980s, Kang worked on Wall Street as an investment banker. He specialized in corporate finance and mergers & acquisitions for Dillon, Read & Co., Inc. Kang is a member of the Council on Foreign Relations. He became a Term Member in 1997 and was elected a Life Member in 2002.

Diplomatic career

Bush administration
During the administration of President George W. Bush, Kang held various senior positions in the State Department, including in the Bureau of Arms Control and Bureau of Political-Military Affairs.  In the Bureau of International Security and Nonproliferation, he served as the Deputy Assistant Secretary of State for Threat Reduction, Export Controls, and Negotiations. He led U.S. efforts to tighten export controls against the proliferation of weapons of mass destruction and their delivery vehicles. Kang also served as the senior nonproliferation policy adviser on the U.S. delegations to the Six-Party Talks under the leadership of Christopher R. Hill. He participated in the sixth round of the Six-Party Talks that produced the 13 February 2007 Joint Statement, resulting in the closure Yongbyon nuclear facility invitation of IAEA inspectors to conduct monitoring and verification measures. In October 2008, he accompanied Christopher R. Hill on his last visit to North Korea He attempted to work out with the North Koreans a verification protocol for denuclearization as Hill tried to shore up the flagging momentum in the Six-Party Talks process.

Obama Administration
Kang has led U.S. diplomatic efforts in various international nuclear fora and multinational negotiations. In 2009, as President Obama launched his Nuclear Security Summit process, Kang—serving as ISN's Acting Assistant Secretary—co-chaired the 2009 Global Initiative to Combat Nuclear Terrorism (GICNT) in the Hague. He delivered a personal message from the President committing his full support for the Initiative and welcoming 75 nations that joined it. While serving as the Deputy Assistant Secretary of State for Nuclear Affairs (2011–2016), in preparation for the February 2015 Diplomatic Conference for the Convention on Nuclear Safety, President Obama accorded Kang the personal rank of ambassador. The international community, divided on the future of nuclear energy, was slow to respond to acute nuclear safety concerns that arose following the 2011 Fukushima nuclear disaster. The leading international forum addressing nuclear safety, Convention on Nuclear Safety, was mired in diplomatic deadlock, as anti-nuclear energy political pressure began to build, especially in Europe. Leading the U.S. delegation to the Diplomatic Conference, Kang secured the swift adoption of a consensus approach to resolving the deadlock. The compromise made possible the adoption of the Vienna Declaration on Nuclear Safety, a milestone in the ongoing international efforts to improve nuclear safety as nuclear energy remains viable but continues to be controversial.

Trump administration
On January 22, 2017, Kang was appointed Principal Deputy Assistant Secretary of the Bureau of International Security and Nonproliferation (ISN), United States Department of State. Throughout 2017, he acted as ISN's Assistant Secretary and exercised the authorities of the Under Secretary of State for Arms Control and International Security. He also served as the Acting Assistant Secretary of State for International Security and Nonproliferation during the Presidential transition between George W. Bush and Barack Obama.

Biden administration
On April 12, 2021, President Joe Biden nominated Kang to be an Assistant Secretary of State for International Security and Nonproliferation. A hearing on his nomination was held before the Senate Foreign Relations Committee on September 15, 2021. On October 19, 2021, his nomination was reported favorably out of committee. Kang's nomination expired at the end of the year, and was returned to President Biden on January 3, 2022. However, Kang's nomination was resent the following day. On March 8, 2022, his nomination was again reported favorably out of committee. Kang was confirmed by the United States Senate on March 29, 2022, via a vote of 52–46.

Awards and recognitions
Kang is a recipient of multiple State Department Superior Honor Award. In 2018, he received from President Trump a congressionally established Presidential Rank Award, one of the most prestigious awards in the federal career service, at the Meritorious Executive Rank.  In 2022, he received from President Biden the same award at the Distinguished Executive Rank.

Personal life 
Kang is married to Michelle Ho and has two sons, both born in Naperville, Illinois.

Selected publications 
"Nuclear Weapons, International Security, and Non-proliferation in the 2020s," in Maiani L., Jeanloz R., Lowenthal M., Plastino W. (eds) International Cooperation for Enhancing Nuclear Safety, Security, Safeguards and Non-proliferation, (Springer Proceedings in Physics, Vol 243), pp. 35–39.
“Japan and Inter-Korean Relations” in ed. Samuel Kim, Inter-Korean Relations: Problems and Prospects (Palgrave, 2004), pp. 97–116.
 “Restructuring the US-South Korea alliance to deal with the second Korean nuclear crisis,” Australian Journal of International Affairs Vol. 57, No. 2 (July 2003), pp. 309–324. 
 “The Developmental State and Democratic Consolidation in South Korea,” in ed. Samuel Kim, Korea’s Democratization (Cambridge University Press, 2003), pp. 220–244.
 “Institutionalizing the Regulation of Inward Foreign Direct Investment,” in eds. Andrew P. Cortell and Susan Peterson, ALTERED STATES: International Relations, Domestic Politics, and Institutional Change (Lexington Books, 2002), pp. 169–193.
 (Lead author, with Y. Kaseda) “Korea and the Dynamics of Japan’s Post-Cold War Security Policy,” World Affairs Vol. 164, No. 2 (Fall 2001), pp. 51–59.
 “North Korea and the U.S. Grand Strategy,” Comparative Strategy Vol. 20, No. 1 (January–March 2001), pp. 25–43. 
 “Segyehwa Reform of the South Korean Developmental State,” in ed. Samuel S. Kim, Korea’s Globalization (Cambridge University Press, 2000), pp. 76–101.
 “The Four-Party Peace Talks: Lost Without a Map,” Comparative Strategy Vol. 17, No. 4 (October–December 1998), pp. 327–344.
 “US politics and greater regulation of inward foreign direct investment,” International Organization Vol. 51, No. 2 (Spring 1997), pp. 301–333.

References

External links 
 Opening Remarks for the NATO North Atlantic Council 
 Celebrating 50 Years of the Treaty of Tlatelolco 
 State’s Kang at Diplomatic Conference on Nuclear Safety
 The Global Initiative to Combat Nuclear Terrorism: Progress to Date
 Obama Supports Initiative Combating Nuclear Terrorism

Ambassadors of the United States
Cornell University alumni
Living people
1962 births
United States Assistant Secretaries of State
American politicians of Korean descent
Biden administration personnel
Lakewood High School (New Jersey) alumni
People from Lakewood Township, New Jersey
New Jersey politicians